Major General Ralph Cyril Cruddas CB DSO (26 August 1900 – 29 April 1979) was Commander of British Forces in Hong Kong.

Military career
Cruddas was commissioned into the Duke of Cornwall's Light Infantry in 1919. He was appointed Private Secretary to the Governor of Assam in India 1933.

He served in World War II being appointed Commanding Officer of 7th Bn Oxfordshire and Buckinghamshire Light Infantry in 1941. After the War he became Commander of the Cyrenaica District of Libya. In 1949, he became Commander of 133rd Infantry Brigade and in 1951 he was made Commander of Land Forces in Hong Kong; he was appointed a Companion of the Order of the Bath in June 1953 and retired in 1955.

References

1900 births
1979 deaths
Companions of the Order of the Bath
Companions of the Distinguished Service Order
Duke of Cornwall's Light Infantry officers
British Army major generals
Oxfordshire and Buckinghamshire Light Infantry officers
British Army personnel of World War II